Kenneth Hervey MacLeay (born 2 April 1959) is a former English-born Australian cricketer.

He was an all-rounder who played 16 One Day Internationals for Australia between 1983 and 1987. MacLeay played in the 1983 Cricket World Cup in England taking 6 for 39 against India.

MacLeay played in 129 first-class matches for Western Australia between 1981 and 1991. He was a regular in a strong WA side appearing in Sheffield Shield final winning team four times. MacLeay also played county cricket in England for Somerset in 1991 and 1992.

In 2001, MacLeay was named as a life member of the WACA Ground in Perth for his contributions to cricket.

Career
In 1982–83 MacLeay leapt to attention when he took 5–7 off 21 balls for WA against Victoria.

International career
He made his one-day debut for Australia in 1982–83 against New Zealand, taking 1–39 and scoring 3. His next game was in the second final; Macleay scored 10 and took 1–56.

In March 1983 he starred for Australian in a special one-off one day match against New Zealand to raise funds to the bushfire victims. MacLeay took 1–42 with the ball and top scored in Australia's (unsuccessful) run chase, with 41 off 37 balls.

He was initially overlooked for selection on the 1983 World Cup but was later called up as a replacement.

He played the West Indies, taking 1–31 and scoring 1. He was kept in the side to play India, only making 4 with the bat but taking 6–39 with the ball. His returns against Zimbabwe were 9 and 0–45. In the second match against India he took 1–48 and scored 5.

Australia tried him in the one day team in 1983–84. In a game against Pakistan he went for 0–39. Against the West Indies his figures were 0–47 and 15. MacLeay was then dropped.

In 1986–87 he scored 114 against NSW.

References

External links
 

1959 births
Living people
Australian cricketers
Australia One Day International cricketers
Buckinghamshire cricketers
English emigrants to Australia
People from Bradford-on-Avon
Somerset cricketers
Western Australia cricketers